Miss Orlando's Outstanding Teen is part of the Miss America Organization and a preliminary to the Miss Florida's Outstanding Teen and Miss America's Outstanding Teen pageants. Here you will find the history of the titleholders as well how they placed at Miss Florida's Outstanding Teen.

Florida

References

External links
 gotcrown.org

Orlando
2005 establishments in Florida
Culture of Orlando, Florida
Annual events in Florida
Recurring events established in 2005
Events in Orlando, Florida